Klaus Senger (born 19 October 1945) is a retired German footballer who played as a defender. He made 181 appearances in the Bundesliga for Schalke 04, Fortuna Düsseldorf and Rot-Weiss Essen.

References

External links 
 

1945 births
Living people
German footballers
Association football defenders
Bundesliga players
FC Schalke 04 players
Fortuna Düsseldorf players
Rot-Weiss Essen players